Auburn House may refer to:
Auburn House Publishing, based in Dover, Massachusetts, now an imprint of Greenwood Publishing Group
Auburn House (Towson, Maryland), listed on the National Register of Historic Places (NRHP)
Auburn (Natchez, Mississippi), mansion, NRHP-listed
Auburn (Bowling Green, Virginia), house, NRHP-listed
Auburn (Brandy Station, Virginia), house and farm, NRHP-listed

See also
Auburn (disambiguation)